Persimmon Run is a  1st order tributary to the  West Branch Christina River in New Castle County, Delaware in the United States.

Course

Persimmon Run rises on the Big Elk Creek divide in Cecil County, Maryland and flows southeast then northeast into New Castle County, Delaware meet the West Branch Christina River at Anvil Park, Delaware.

Watershed
Persimmon Run drains  of area, receives about 46.2 in/year of precipitation, has a topographic wetness index of 503.39 and is about 21.7% forested.

See also
List of Delaware rivers

Maps

References

Rivers of Delaware
Rivers of Maryland
Rivers of New Castle County, Delaware
Rivers of Cecil County, Maryland
Tributaries of the Christina River